The Soviet Union's 1956 nuclear test series was a group of 9 nuclear tests conducted in 1956. These tests followed the 1955 Soviet nuclear tests series and preceded the 1957 Soviet nuclear tests series.

Notes

References

External links
Exposed: Soviet cover-up of nuclear fallout worse than Chernobyl at New Scientist

1956
1956 in the Soviet Union
1956 in military history
Explosions in 1956